Choomba is an Australian electronic dance music duo consisting of cousins, record producer Christian Benson and Timothy Benson. The project formed in 2019. They received full rotation on Triple J with their song "La Luh". The pair have played Wildlands Festival, Spilt Milk and The Grass Is Greener. They hosted the electronic music program The Nudge on Triple J from August 2021 until their departure in March 2022.

Career
Choomba first started in Amsterdam. Christian picked up drums at high school before moving to Perth where an Avicii video on YouTube inspired him to try producing.

On 11 March 2022, the duo announced their departure from Triple J after six months on air, citing a significant international tour schedule which they stated would "limit their ability to present the show to its full potential and capacity."

Luude's "Down Under" remix success
In 2021, Luude remixed Men at Work's "Down Under" as a drum and bass track, which became popular song online. Men at Work's lead singer Colin Hay re-recorded the vocal for the track's official release on the Sweat It Out record label with the track, now credited to Luude featuring Colin Hay, charting at number 32 on the UK Singles chart on 7 January 2022 and at number 48 in Australia.

Musical style and influences
Choomba's musical style consists of tech house and bass.

Discography

Extended plays

Singles

As lead artist

References

2019 establishments in Australia
Australian house music groups
Australian musical duos
Electronic dance music duos
EMI Music Australia artists
Living people
Musical groups established in 2019
Musical groups from Perth, Western Australia
Spinnin' Records artists
Triple J announcers
Year of birth missing (living people)